This is a list of the cotton and other textile mills in Chadderton, Greater Manchester, England.

A–E

F–J

K–O

P–T

U–Z

See also
List of mills in Oldham
List of mills in Shaw and Crompton

References
 

Notes

Bibliography

External links
 Chadderton Historical Society: History textile mills in Chadderton webpage

Buildings and structures in Chadderton
Chadderton
Chadderton
Chadderton
History of the textile industry
Industrial Revolution in England
Grade II listed buildings in Greater Manchester
Grade II listed industrial buildings